Thundersley is a town and former civil parish, now in the unparished area of Benfleet, in the Castle Point borough, in southeast Essex, England. In 1951 the parish had a population of 6482.

Its main parish takes in Daws Heath to the east which is also part of the current Cedar Hall local government electoral ward. The two areas have Anglican churches. A third Anglican church is in the secular ward of St John's, which is commonly conflated on maps with South Benfleet which it adjoins and it is separated from Thundersley by a narrow green buffer. Between the two wards is the main ward of St Peter's, which loosely resembles the very longstanding church parish. One ward is partially in Thundersley, Boyce which includes Thundersley Green and various short streets next to the town itself.

Toponymy
Thundersley derives from the Old English Þunres lēah = "grove or meadow [perhaps sacred] belonging to the god Thunor or Thor". It has also historically been known as Thunresleam. The place-name is first attested in the Domesday Book of 1086, where it appears as Thunreslea.

The place-name is historically significant as a survival from England's pre-Christian Anglo-Saxon paganism.

Geography
The town is partly rural, with large woods and commons; including Thundersley Common (a Site of Special Scientific Interest), Shipwrights Wood (12 hectares) and Thundersley Glen all owned and managed by the council; West Wood (22½ hectares acres) owned by the council and managed by Castle Point Wildlife Group; Tile Wood (6½ hectares) and Pound Wood (22¼ hectares) are owned by the Essex Wildlife Trust; Starvelarks Wood and Wyburns Wood are both part of Little Haven Nature Reserve (37¼ hectares) which is owned by Havens Hospice Trust and leased to Essex Wildlife Trust; Coombe Wood is under mixed ownership and much of it has Village Green status.

Employment
A clear majority of households in all wards are economically employed (or in self-employment). The proportion of people who are retired is slightly higher than the national average.

Retirement rate

Tenure
The wards have a high rate of owner-occupation. In the 2011 census tenure is stated for all 8570 wards of England and Wales, all of Thundersley's wards ranked between 236th and 341st as to this statistic (the degree to which the census returnees stated they owned their homes either outright or with a mortgage). Specifically these varied in owner-occupation between 87.5% and 88.6%, the average in the jurisdiction being 67.8%.

History
Samuel Lewis (publisher)'s major work, a Topographical Dictionary of England in 1848 gives this account:
THUNDERSLEY (St. Peter), a parish, in the union of Billericay [...] S.[outh] division of Essex, 2¼ miles (S. W. by W.) from Rayleigh; containing 596 inhabitants, of whom 120 are in the hamlet. This parish is about two miles in length [east-west], and a mile and a half in breadth, and comprises 2100 acres, of which 100 are common or waste; the village is on elevated ground, and the surrounding scenery is pleasingly diversified. The [parish priest] living...[was] valued in the king's books at £14. 13. 4., and in the gift [appointment of the Rev. G. Hemming: the tithes have been commuted [near-eliminated] for £570; there is a parsonage-house, and the glebe comprises 40 acres. The church is a venerable structure in the later Norman and early English styles, with a tower and spire.

Schools and colleges
There are three secondary schools in the district – The King John School and Sixth Form, The Deanes and The Appleton School and Sixth Form College. Five primary schools are Thundersley, Westwood, Kingston, Montgomerie, and Robert Drake. The main campus of SEEVIC Further Education College is also in the district, now part of USP College.

Governance
On 1 April 1974 as a result of the Local Government Act 1972, Thundersley, along with Canvey Island, Hadleigh, and South Benfleet, has formed the parliamentary constituency of Castle Point and local government district and borough of Castle Point.

Thundersley elects one councillor to Essex County Council. Within Castle Point Borough Council, Thundersley is represented by 12 councillors, all Conservative, elected from the wards (from west to east) of St George, St Peter and Cedar Hall.

The Parish of Thundersley included Daws Heath. The western part of Thundersley (approximately St George's parish or the St George ward) is known as New Thundersley.

Thundersley is within the SS7 Postcode Area..

Transport
Thundersley is bounded by the A127 road to the north, where it borders the Borough of Rayleigh, the A130 road to the west where it borders the villages of North Benfleet and Bowers Gifford. The A13 road to the south and eastwards beyond the A129 road bordering through Daws Heath, Belfairs Park in Leigh-on-Sea and Hadleigh.

The nearest railway stations are Benfleet railway station and Rayleigh railway station. The London Tilbury and Southend LT&SR 79 Class 4-4-2T No. 80 locomotive Thundersley was named after this area, and it is on exhibition at Bressingham Steam and Gardens in Norfolk, on loan from the National Railway Museum.

Thundersley Rovers Sports Club
Thundersley Rovers Sports Club was formed in 1963 by local football fan Keith Walker. The Club was a founder member of the Thundermite League in 1966 and it is from the Club that the league took its name. From those early beginnings the Club grew exponentially and within a decade Rovers boasted three senior teams (two Saturday and one Sunday) plus six youth teams (under 10s through to under 15s), all of whom played in the Southend Junior League.

In 1980, the Club found a permanent home at Thundersley Common having played at various venues (including Woodside Park, the John Borrows Ground, Benfleet Rec., Dark Lane and Scrub Lane). 'The Common', now synonymous with the Club, has remained the club's home ground ever since. Since the beginning of the 2012/13 season, it has been the home venue for both junior and senior Thundersley Rovers teams.

In 2012, at a time when Thundersley Rovers consisted of just two senior teams, the Club - under a new Committee - relaunched its Academy having had no representation at junior or youth level since the 1990s. As of 2021, the Club listed 13 junior and youth teams on its roster - including its first all-girls team - plus one Senior team.

Although officially named Thundersley Rovers Sports Club, the only sport the club has participated in competitively to date is football. In 2013, the Club celebrated its 50th anniversary. In 2021, the Club - under the chairmanship of Graeme Howlett, who had succeeded his father Ray Howlett as Chairman in 2010 - donated £50,000 to local and national charities including Havens Hospices, The Castle Point Association of Voluntary Services and Centrepoint.

At the beginning of the 2021/2022 season, the club- under the new chairmanship of James Gates continued to thrive in having 17 sides playing every Sunday across the club. 13 (boys), 3 (girls) & 1 (senior) side.

2021/2022 Teams:

U7 Blacks (Andy Moat & Michael Slough)
 
U7 Whites (Scott Fitzmaurice)

U8 Blacks (Darren Wingrove)

U8 Whites (Chris Langley)

U8 Reds   (Darren Ridgway)

U9 Yellows (Laura Ward)- Girls

U9 Blacks (Scott Hines)

U9 Whites (James Preston)

U10 Yellows (Jamie Collins)- Girls

U10 Blacks (James Gates)

U10 Whites (Michael Kelly)

U12 Blacks (Colin Smith)

U12 Whites (Paul Caley)

U12 Yellows (Colin Smith)- Girls

U13 Blacks (Lee Morrell)

U14 Blacks (Scott Petty)

Seniors    (Liam Wilson)- Open Age

Greeves motorcycles
Greeves motorcycles were produced in a purpose-built factory at Thundersley from 1953 to 1976. Initially the bikes were an offshoot of the Invacar company, which produced invalid cars and needed to diversify its products.

The bikes were exclusively two-stroke powered, using proprietary engines from Villiers and British Anzani initially and always for the roadsters, but by 1964 they had developed their own engine for competition use. For a few years, Greeves were successful in competition, with wins in the European Motocross Championship, the Manx Grand Prix, the European Trials Championship and the Scottish Six Days Trial, and with gold medals in the ISDT and the ACU 250 cc Road Race.

Culture

Churches
Air Training Cadets
Air Training Corps Squadron - (1341) is based in Thundersley.

Anglican churches
The Parish of Thundersley has three Anglican churches: St Peter's, Thundersley, St George's, New Thundersley and St Michael's, Daws Heath the original of which has been replaced by an enhanced timber church, consecrated by the Bishop of Bradwell on 1 December 2012.)

Fully reformed Christian churches include Thundersley Congregational Church which runs as its mission The Beacon, Thundersley Gospel Hall, Daws Heath Evangelical Church
and Thundersley Community Church at Cedar Hall School.

Thundersley Christian Spiritualist Church
Thundersley Christian Spiritualist Church was formed in October 1933 and moved to a wooden hut on Bread and Cheese Hill in July 1947. A new building opened at the same site in 1998.

See also
Daws Heath, the east of the parish which has its own church.
South Benfleet, on many slightly badly drawn modern maps, such as Google maps as to small places, appear to include the much smaller parish of New Thundersley.  It is contiguous with that equally modern small town or village, separated along its main east–west street.

Notable people
 Chessplayer, journalist and author James Mason (1849-1905), who became one the world's best half-dozen chess players in the 1880s, is buried in Thundersley churchyard.
 Novelist Fergus Hume (1859-1932), author of The Mystery of a Hansom Cab, spent the last 30 years of his life in Thundersley and is buried there.
 The writer Bernard Cornwell (b.1944), author of the Sharpe novels, grew up in Thundersley.
 The rector of Thundersley, Robert Drake was burnt at the stake in 1556 for refusing to renounce his protestant faith.

Gallery

References
References

Notes

Further reading
 Terry Babbington. (1993). Thundersley - A Pictorial History. Phillimore. .
 John Greig. (1818). Antiquarian and Topographical Cabinet, Containing a Series of Elegant Views of the most interesting objects of curiosity in Great Britain Vol III. Thundersley, Essex. Published by J. Murray [etc.] page 202, plate 98.

External links
 Essex Wildlife Trust
 Pound Wood
 Thundersley Christian Spiritualist Church

Populated places in Essex
Place names
Former civil parishes in Essex
Anglo-Saxon paganism
Castle Point